Grachyov, feminine: Grachyova, is a Russian-language family name derived from the word grach, "rook" (bird), it may also be transliterated as Grachov, Grachova, Grachev, Gracheva; Gratchev, Gratcheva, Gratshev, Gratsheva. This surname is present only in Russia except for a small number of Russian-born people with the same surname in Belarus. Its Ukrainian-language counterpart: Hrachov. It may refer to:
Alexander Grachev (born 1984), Russian ice dancer
Boris Grachev (born 1986), Russian chess grandmaster
 Denis Grachev (fighter) (born 1982), Russian boxer, kickboxer and mixed martial artist
 Denis Grachev (badminton) (born 1992), Russian badminton player
Dmitri Grachyov (born 1983), Russian football player
Dmytro Hrachov (born 1983), Ukrainian archer
Evgeny Grachyov (born 1990), Russian ice hockey centreman
Hlib Hrachov (born 1997), Ukrainian football player
Konstantin Grachev (born 1927), Russian sprinter
Maxim Gratchev (born 1988), Russian ice hockey player
Nadezhda Gracheva (born 1969), Russian ballerina and ballet teacher 
Pavel Grachev (1948–2012), Russian general and the Defence Minister
Tatyana Gracheva (born 1973), Russian volleyball player.
Vadim Gratshev (1963–2006), Russian palaeoentomologist
Varvara Gracheva (born 2000), Russian tennis player
Viacheslav Grachev (born 1973), Russian rugby union player
Viktor Hrachov (born 1956), Ukrainian footballer and manager
Vladimir Grachev (born 1942), Russian scientist, statesman and ecologist
Vitaliy Vladasovich Grachyov (born 1979), aka Vitas - Russian Singer/Songwriter/Actor/Fashion Designer 

Russian-language surnames